Richard Francis Bollard (23 May 1863 – 25 August 1927) was a farmer and New Zealand politician of the Reform Party. He represented the Raglan electorate from 1911 to 1927, when he died. As Minister of Internal Affairs, he was a cabinet minister from 1923 to 1927 in the Reform Government.

He was reported making speeches and opening events and buildings; in 1912 farewelling the local publican, in 1914 opening Matangi post office, in 1915 opening the Winter Show of the Raglan A. and P. Association and opening  Whatawhata post office. As Minister for Internal Affairs he opened Te Uku post office and Te Hutewai School in 1924, Raglan footbridge in 1926 and in 1924 was reported as making three calls one day and two the next, in between catching the train from Auckland to Wellington.

Bollard was the eldest son of John Bollard, also a Member of Parliament.

Notes

References

|-

1863 births
1927 deaths
Reform Party (New Zealand) MPs
Members of the Cabinet of New Zealand
New Zealand MPs for North Island electorates
Members of the New Zealand House of Representatives